Slavín is a tomb at the Vyšehrad Cemetery in Prague. Many notable Czech personalities are interred in the tomb.

History
The idea of the establishment of the pantheon, a final resting place for outstanding Czech personalities, appeared in the 1880s. The initiators were Vyšehrad provost and Mikuláš Karlach and Mayor of Smíchov Petr Matěj Fischer, who also helped to finance the monument.

The monumental tomb was designed by architect Antonín Wiehl. Slavín was built in the years 1889–1893 on the eastern side of the Vyšehrad Cemetery. The sculptural decorations were made by Josef Mauder (1854–1920). Poet Julius Zeyer was the first person to be buried in the tomb, in 1901, eight years after its completion. The tomb contains 44 burial tombs, mostly with coffins, though some urns are stored as well. The remains of 55 people are currently interred in Slavín.

Notable interments

References 
 Slavin.cz

External links
 

19th-century establishments in Bohemia
1893 establishments in Austria-Hungary
Cemeteries in Prague
Tombs
Outdoor sculptures in Prague
Statues in Prague
19th-century architecture in the Czech Republic